Ougapia is a genus of air-breathing land snails, terrestrial pulmonate gastropod mollusks in the family Rhytididae.

Species
Species within the genus Ougapia include:
 Ougapia spaldingi

References

 Nomenclator Zoologicus info

Rhytididae
Taxonomy articles created by Polbot